Prince Jean of Orléans, Duke of Guise (Jean Pierre Clément Marie; 4 September 1874 – 25 August 1940), was the third son and youngest child of Prince Robert, Duke of Chartres (1840–1910), grandson of Prince Ferdinand Philippe and great-grandson of Louis Philippe I, King of the French. His mother was Françoise of Orléans, daughter of François, Prince of Joinville, and Princess Francisca of Brazil. He was the Orléanist claimant to the throne of France as Jean III.

Biography
In 1926 at the death of his cousin and brother-in-law Philippe, Duke of Orléans, claimant to the defunct throne of France as "Philip VIII", Jean was recognised by his Orléanist supporters as titular king of France with the name "Jean III". The claim was disputed by supporters of the Infante Jaime, Duke of Madrid, Legitimist claimant to the defunct French throne.

Jean was an amateur historian and archeologist, who lived with his family in a large farm near Rabat, Morocco. He and his eldest son were legally forbidden from ever entering France, due to an 1886 edict which condemned the heads of Bourbon & Bonaparte dynasties, as well as their heirs apparent, to exile.

Jean died in Larache, Morocco, in 1940. He was succeeded as Orléanist claimant to the defunct French throne by his only son, Henri d' Orléans, Count of Paris.

Marriage and issue

In 1899, Jean married his first cousin, Isabelle d'Orléans (1878–1961). She was the younger sister of Philip VIII, and the daughter of Philip VII and Marie Isabelle d'Orléans.

They had four children:

Isabelle d'Orléans (1900–1983). First married in 1923 to Marie Hervé Jean Bruno, Count of Harcourt (1899–1930) and then to Prince Pierre Murat in 1934.
Françoise d'Orléans (1902–1953). Married to Christopher of Greece and Denmark in 1929. He was a son of George I of Greece and Grand Duchess Olga Constantinovna of Russia. They were parents of Prince Michael of Greece and Denmark.
Anne d'Orléans (1906–1986). She married Amedeo, 3rd Duke of Aosta in 1927.
Henri d'Orléans, Count of Paris (1908–1999). Married to Princess Isabelle of Orléans-Braganza.

Ancestry

References

External links
 

1874 births
1940 deaths
Dukes of Guise
Dukes of Montpensier
Orléanist pretenders to the French throne
Princes of France (Orléans)
Burials at the Chapelle royale de Dreux
Royal reburials